Sri Lanka’s Rebel Wife: A woman’s search for her missing husband is a documentary by Kannan Arunasalam about missing Tamil rebels who surrendered to the Sri Lankan Army in the final stages of the Sri Lankan civil War. It deals with the case of Ananthi Sasitharan 's husband EIilan who surrendered to the Sri Lankan army and was never seen again.

References

2022 films
Documentary films about war
Films about the Sri Lankan Civil War
Documentary films about the Sri Lankan Civil War